Tramonti is the name of several areas in Italy:
Tramonti, Campania
Tramonti di Sotto, Pordenone
Tramonti di Sopra, Pordenone